William  Forsythe (born June 7, 1955) is an American actor. He is best known for his portrayal of tough-guy, criminal characters, and has starred in films such as American Me (1992), Raising Arizona (1987), Dick Tracy (1990),  Gotti (1996), The Rock (1996), and The Devil's Rejects (2005). He has also played recurring characters in television series such as Boardwalk Empire (2010) and Justified (2010).

Forsythe was nominated for the Independent Spirit Award for Best Supporting Male for his performance in the indie film The Waterdance.

Early life
William Forsythe was born in the New York City borough of Brooklyn, and grew up in its Bedford–Stuyvesant neighborhood. He is of partial Italian descent.

Career
Forsythe started out in minor film roles and guest appearances in high-rated TV shows including CHiPs (1977), Hill Street Blues (1981) and T. J. Hooker (1982). He appeared in Once Upon a Time in America (1984), co-starred with John Goodman in Raising Arizona (1987) and as a renegade soldier in Extreme Prejudice.

Forsythe also portrayed comic book villain "Flattop" in Dick Tracy (1990), co-starred with Steven Seagal in Out for Justice (1991) and appeared with former National Football League player Brian Bosworth in the biker action film Stone Cold (1991). He portrayed Al Capone in the short-lived '90s revival of the classic '60s TV crime show The Untouchables (1993), and also starred in The Waterdance (1992) and the film noir Things to Do in Denver When You're Dead (1995).  Forsythe portrayed real-life mobster "Sammy The Bull" Gravano in Gotti (1996)
and supported another ex-NFL player's foray into film acting when L.A. Raider Howie Long debuted in Firestorm (1998).

Forsythe portrayed serial killer John Wayne Gacy in Dear Mr. Gacy, a film adaptation of The Last Victim, the memoirs of Jason Moss, a college student who corresponded with Gacy his last year on death row. The film was released in 2010.

Filmography

Film

Television

References

External links

 

1955 births
American male film actors
American male television actors
Living people
Male actors from New York City
People from Bedford–Stuyvesant, Brooklyn
American people of Italian descent